The Paris-Saclay Faculty of Sciences or Orsay Faculty of Sciences, in French : Faculté des sciences d'Orsay, is the mathematics and physics school within Paris-Saclay University, founded in 1956. It offers undergraduate and graduate degrees in mathematics, physics and chemistry (though its undergraduates are officially enrolled in Paris-Saclay Undergraduate School). 

Previously the Paris-Sud Faculty of Sciences, the School assumed its current structure in 2019. Christine Paulin-Mohring has been the School's dean since 2016.

Recent investments as part of the Paris-Saclay cluster have enlarged the School's faculty and upgraded its facilities. In July 2020, Paris-Saclay was ranked first worldwide for Mathematics by Academic Ranking of World Universities (ARWU) and 9th worldwide for Physics (1st in Europe). The Faculty has produced numerous research discoveries and many distinguished alumni and professors.

History 
Established in 1956, the Paris-Saclay Faculty of Sciences was originally part of the University of Paris (founded in c. 1150), which was subsequently split into several universities. 

After World War II, the rapid growth of nuclear physics and chemistry meant that research needed more and more powerful accelerators, which required large areas. The University of Paris, the École Normale Supérieure and the Collège de France looked for space in the south of Paris near Orsay. Later some of the teaching activity of the Faculty of Sciences in Paris was transferred to Orsay in 1956 at the request of Irène Joliot-Curie and Frédéric Joliot-Curie. The rapid increase of students led to the independence of the Orsay Center on March 1, 1965.

Now it hosts a great number of laboratories on its large (236 ha) campus in Paris-Saclay. Many of the top French laboratories are among them especially in particle physics, nuclear physics, astrophysics, atomic physics and molecular physics, condensed matter physics, theoretical physics, electronics, nanoscience and nanotechnology. The faculty comprises some 40 research units.

Academic overview

Nobel and Fields laureates 

 Albert Fert - Professor - Nobel in Physics - 2007
 Pierre-Gilles de Gennes - Professor - Nobel in Physics - 1991
 Ngô Bảo Châu - PhD and Professor - Fields Medal - 2010
 Wendelin Werner - Professor - Fields Medal - 2006
 Laurent Lafforgue - PhD and Professor - Fields Medal - 2002
 Jean-Christophe Yoccoz - PhD and Professor - Fields Medal - 1994
 Pierre Deligne - PhD - Fields Medal - 1978

See also 

 Paris-Saclay University
 Paris-Saclay
 France
 Science
 Mathematics

References

External links 

 Faculty of Sciences official homepage

Paris-Saclay University
Academic staff of Paris-Saclay University
Paris-Saclay